Irish North Western Railway (INW) was an Irish gauge railway company in Ireland.

Development

In 1859 the D&ER reached  where it connected with the Londonderry and Enniskillen Railway (L&ER). The L&ER had been completed in 1854 but had been unprofitable, so in 1860 it leased its line in perpetuity to the D&ER.

In the same year the company renamed itself the Irish North Western Railway. In 1863 the Ulster Railway reached Clones where it made a junction with the INW.

In 1876 the INW merged with the Northern Railway of Ireland and the Ulster Railway to form the Great Northern Railway.

After merger
The GNR operated the line between Dundalk and Enniskillen until 1957, when the Government of Northern Ireland made the GNR Board close all cross-border lines except the Dublin and Belfast Junction Railway mainline. Córas Iompair Éireann continued a freight service between Dundalk and Clones for a few years, but withdrew this and closed the line in 1960.

References

Sources

Closed railways in Northern Ireland
Railway companies established in 1862
Railway companies disestablished in 1876
Irish gauge railways
Great Northern Railway (Ireland)
Defunct railway companies of Ireland
Transport in County Cavan
Transport in County Fermanagh
Transport in County Monaghan
1862 establishments in Ireland